Arthur Lloyd Hansell  (1865–1948)  was an Anglican priest in the 20th century, most notably Archdeacon of Wairarapa from 1922 to 1945.

Hansell was  educated at  Magdalen College, Oxford  and Ripon College Cuddesdon; and ordained in 1891. After a curacy in Wantage he held incumbencies at Karori and Lower Hutt.

References

Archdeacons of Wairarapa
Alumni of Magdalen College, Oxford
Alumni of Ripon College Cuddesdon
1865 births
1948 deaths